Gérard Balanche (born 18 January 1964) is a Swiss ski jumper who competed from 1985 to 1989. He finished eighth in the team large hill event at the 1988 Winter Olympics in Calgary. Balanche finished 34th in the individual normal hill event at the 1989 FIS Nordic World Ski Championships in Lahti. His best World Cup career finish was third in a large hill event in Norway in 1985.

External links

Gérard Balanche's profile at Sports Reference.com
Gérard Balanche's profile at Swiss Olympians

1964 births
Living people
Ski jumpers at the 1988 Winter Olympics
Swiss male ski jumpers